The 2008 Delaware State Hornets football team represented Delaware State University as a member of the Mid-Eastern Athletic Conference (MEAC) in the 2008 NCAA Division I FCS football season. They were led by fifth-year head coach Al Lavan and played their home games at Alumni Stadium. They and finished the season with a record of 5–6 overall and 5–3 in MEAC play, tying for second place.

Schedule

References

Delaware State
Delaware State Hornets football seasons
Delaware State Hornets football